"Wild Nights – Wild Nights!" is an 1861 poem by Emily Dickinson. It was included in her posthumous collection of Poems, Second Series, published November 9, 1891.

Analysis

Dickinson's posthumous editor Thomas Wentworth Higginson thought the poem was too erotic for a woman he deemed pure and was initially reluctant to print the poem, "lest the malignant read into it more than that virgin recluse ever dream of putting there". Modern readers now, however, recognize the poem as one of her most erotic and find in the text Dickinson's understanding of sexual passion.

The poem is structurally unusual for Dickinson, using lines with only two metric feet instead of her typical three and four feet iambs. Judith Farr writes that the opening spondees makes the poem theatrical, turbulent, and stormy, appropriate for the subject matter, and shows her interest in the Brontë sisters and Wuthering Heights. She also notes that "Wild Nights" is perhaps the most "Dickinsonian" of her poems in that it is "ironic, paradoxical, voluptuous, and terse all at once."

For the Poetry Society of America's Reading Through the Decades series, Sarah Arvio writes of the poem:

In popular culture
It is set in Harmonium by John Adams (1981).

The poem is the origin of the title Wild Nights with Emily, a 2018 biopic of Dickinson starring Molly Shannon.

Actress Najarra Townsend recites the poem in its entirety in the 2017 film Mercury in Retrograde.

In the 2019 TV show Dickinson (TV series) the poem serves as the title of its third episode and is read by Austin Dickinson while looking for evidence that Emily and Sue love each other.

References

Further reading

External links 
 
 Manuscript at the Emily Dickinson Archive

Poetry by Emily Dickinson
Love poems